Leila Wynne Lake is a lake in the province of Newfoundland and Labrador in Eastern Canada.  it is  northeast of the Canadian capital of Ottawa.

The vegetation around Leila Wynne Lake is primarily low growing subarctic forest. The population density is fewer than two inhabitants per square kilometer.  The region is part of the boreal climate zone. The average annual air temperature is -7 °C. The warmest month is August, when the average temperature is 12 °C and the coldest is January, with -25 °C.

Most of Leila Wynne Lake is underlain by marble of the Denault Formation. The southern shore has a bedrock of schist.

References 

Lakes of Newfoundland and Labrador